Puhatubari पुहाँतुबारी is a village in Bhadrapur municipality, Jhapa district, Province No. 1, in eastern Nepal.

References

Populated places in Jhapa District